The red milkweed beetle (Tetraopes tetrophthalmus) is a beetle in the family Cerambycidae.

Explanation of names

The binomial genus and species names are both derived from the Ancient Greek for "four eyes." As in many longhorn beetles, the antennae are situated very near the eye–in the red milkweed beetle, this adaptation has been carried to an extreme: the antennal base actually bisects the eye (See Fig. 1).

Host plants

The milkweed beetle, a herbivore, is given this name because it is host-specific to common milkweed (Asclepias syriaca).  It has been reported on horsetail milkweed (Asclepias verticillata) in a disturbed site in Illinois.

Toxicity

It is thought the beetle, which as an adult feeds on the foliage of the plant, and its early instars, which eat the roots, derive a measure of protection from predators by incorporating toxins from the plant into their bodies, thereby becoming distasteful, much as the monarch butterfly and its larvae do.

Behavior

These beetles feed by opening veins in the milkweed plant, decreasing the beetles' exposure to latex-like sap.
When startled, the beetles make a shrill noise, while they make a 'purring' noise when interacting with another beetle.
The red and black coloring are aposematic, advertising the beetles' inedibility.
Red milkweed beetles lay egg-clutches in mid-summer inside the stem base of the milkweed plant.

References

External links

 

Tetraopini
Aposematic species
Beetles described in 1771
Taxa named by Johann Reinhold Forster